Prepotto is a comune (municipality) in the Province of Udine in the Italian region Friuli-Venezia Giulia, located about  northwest of Trieste and about  east of Udine, on the border with Slovenia.

Prepotto borders the following municipalities: Brda (Slovenia), Kanal ob Soči (Slovenia), Cividale del Friuli, Corno di Rosazzo, Dolegna del Collio, San Leonardo, San Pietro al Natisone, Stregna.

Demographic evolution

See also 
Venetian Slovenia

References

Cities and towns in Friuli-Venezia Giulia